The Movement Action Plan is a strategic model for waging nonviolent social movements developed by Bill Moyer, a US social change activist. The MAP, initially developed by Moyer in the late 1970s, uses case studies of successful social movements to illustrate eight distinct stages through social movements' progress, and is designed to help movement activists choose the most effective tactics and strategies to match their movements' current stage.

The eight stages
Moyer describes the eight stages as:
 Critical social problem exists
 Prove failure of official institutions
 Ripening conditions
 Take off
 Perception of failure 
 Majority public opinion
 Success
 Continuation

References

External links
 Doing Democracy: The MAP Model for Organizing Social Movements
 The Movement Action Plan
 Training for Change, training in planning and strategy for movement groups
 Nonviolence Training Project: Planning and Strategy
 Campaign case studies based on Movement Action Plan

Social movements
Action plans